Kanaga Island  is a part of the Andreanof Islands group of the Aleutian Islands in Alaska. The island's most notable feature is Mount Kanaga, a  volcano which last erupted in 1995.

Gallery

References

 "Kanaga Island". Encyclopædia Britannica. Retrieved July 7, 2005.

Andreanof Islands
Islands of Alaska
Islands of Unorganized Borough, Alaska